Riverside is an unincorporated community in Charles County, Maryland, United States, located around the intersection of Maryland routes 6 and 224 beside the Potomac River.  It is considered part of the greater Nanjemoy community. Although quite isolated today, for many generations Riverside was the site of a general store serving riverboat travelers. It is listed in the Maryland Inventory of Historic Properties as the Riverside Historic District.

References

Unincorporated communities in Maryland
Unincorporated communities in Charles County, Maryland